Union Pacific Railway Company v. Botsford, 141 U.S. 250 (1891), was a case before the United States Supreme Court.

Background
A railroad passenger, Clara L. Botsford, sustained permanent injuries to her brain and spinal cord when a berth from a sleeping car fell upon her head.  She sued the railroad for negligence in the construction of the railroad car which allegedly caused her injuries. The Union Pacific Railway Company claimed that it was entitled, without her consent, to an opportunity to surgically examine her to determine her diagnosis and the extent of her injuries.

Decision
The court disagreed, holding that there was no authority under the common law or statutory law for the trial court to order such an examination: "No right is held more sacred, or is more carefully guarded by the common law, than the right of every individual to the possession and control of his own person, free from all restraint or interference of others, unless by clear and unquestionable authority of law."

See also
Union Pacific R. Co. v. Cheyenne (1885)
Kansas Pacific R. Co. v. Dunmeyer (1885)
Brushaber v. Union Pacific Railroad (1916)
Union Pacific Railroad v. Brotherhood of Locomotive Engineers (2009)

References

External links
 

United States Supreme Court cases
1891 in United States case law
Railway litigation in 1891
Union Pacific Railroad
United States Supreme Court cases of the Fuller Court
United States tort case law
Medical privacy